Clitherall may refer to a community in the United States:

Clitherall, Minnesota
Clitherall Lake, a lake in Minnesota
Clitherall Township, Otter Tail County, Minnesota